Lomné is a commune in the Hautes-Pyrénées department in south-western France.

Geography

Climate

Lomné has an oceanic climate (Köppen climate classification Cfb).

See also
Communes of the Hautes-Pyrénées department

References

Communes of Hautes-Pyrénées